Duet is a collaborative album by Doris Day and the André Previn trio, with songs arranged by Previn. The album was issued by Columbia Records (8552) in both monaural (catalog number CL-1752) and stereophonic (catalog number CS-8552) versions on February 22, 1962.  Doris Day selected the songs.

Track listing
"Close Your Eyes" (Bernice Petkere) – 3:14
"Fools Rush In (Where Angels Fear to Tread)" (Rube Bloom, Johnny Mercer) – 3:55
"Yes" (André Previn, Dory Langdon Previn) – 3:28
"Nobody's Heart" (Richard Rodgers, Lorenz Hart) – 3:57
"Remind Me" (Jerome Kern, Dorothy Fields) – 4:03
"Who Are We to Say (Obey Your Heart)" (Sigmund Romberg, Gus Kahn) – 3:04
"Daydreaming" (André Previn, Dory Langdon Previn) – 3:11
"Give Me Time" (Alec Wilder) – 3:31
"Control Yourself"  (André Previn, Dory Langdon Previn) – 3:00
"Wait Till You See Him" (Richard Rodgers, Lorenz Hart) – 3:08
"My One and Only Love" (Guy Wood, Robert Mellin) – 3:43
"Falling in Love Again" (Sammy Lerner, Frederick Hollander) – 2:55

Personnel
Doris Day - vocals
The André Previn trio
André Previn - piano
Red Mitchell - double bass
Frank Capp -drums

References

1962 albums
Vocal duet albums
Doris Day albums
André Previn albums
Columbia Records albums
Albums produced by Irving Townsend